Dikhtiar is a surname. Notable people with the surname include: 

 Alina Dikhtiar (born 1988), Ukrainian pair skater
 Serhiy Dikhtiar (born 1975), Ukrainian footballer

See also
 

Ukrainian-language surnames